Byron McGuigan (born 20 August 1989) is a rugby union outside centre or wing for Scotland in international rugby and for Sale Sharks in the English Premiership. He was born in Walvis Bay – then a South African exclave, but part of modern-day Namibia – and grew up in Cape Town, where he came through the  academy before his first taste of first class rugby with the Border Bulldogs in 2010 and 2011. After a short spell with the Scotland Sevens team, he returned to fifteens rugby, playing for Glasgow Warriors, Exeter Chiefs and Sale Sharks, culminating in a call-up to Scotland in 2017.

Professional career

He played for Glasgow Warriors in the Pro12 having previously represented the Border Bulldogs in South Africa's Vodacom Cup competition.

It was announced in April 2014 that he had left Glasgow Warriors after 20 appearances and four tries over two seasons.

On 2 November 2014, it was announced by Aviva Premiership side Exeter Chiefs that McGuigan would be joining them for the 2014–15 season on a one-year deal. On 27 July 2016, McGuigan signed a two-year deal with Premiership rivals Sale Sharks from the 2016–17 season.

International career

McGuigan received his first call up to the senior Scotland squad by coach Gregor Townsend for the Autumn Internationals, making his debut against New Zealand as a second-half replacement. During his full debut the following week, McGuigan scored his first two international tries against Australia. He will play for Namibia in the 2023 World Cup.

International tries

References

External links 
 Byron McGuigan at itsrugby.co.uk
 

1989 births
Living people
Bay of Plenty rugby union players
Border Bulldogs players
Exeter Chiefs players
Expatriate rugby union players in New Zealand
Glasgow Warriors players
Male rugby sevens players
Rugby union centres
Rugby union fullbacks
Rugby union players from Walvis Bay
Scotland 'A' international rugby union players
Scotland international rugby sevens players
Scotland international rugby union players
Scottish rugby union players